Margaret Ellen Noonan (born 1950), known as Peggy Noonan, is a weekly columnist for The Wall Street Journal, and contributor to NBC News and ABC News. She was a primary speechwriter and Special Assistant to President Ronald Reagan from 1984 to 1986 and has maintained a center-right leaning in her writings since leaving the Reagan administration. Five of Noonan's books have been New York Times bestsellers.

Noonan was nominated for an Emmy Award for her work on America: A Tribute to Heroes.

Early life and early career
Noonan was born on September 7, 1950, in Brooklyn, New York, the daughter of a merchant seaman. She is of Irish descent. Noonan is a graduate of Rutherford High School in Rutherford, New Jersey, and Fairleigh Dickinson University.

Noonan worked as the daily CBS Radio commentary writer for anchorman Dan Rather at CBS News, whom she once called "the best boss I ever had." From 1975 through 1977 she worked the overnight shift as a newswriter at WEEI Radio in Boston, where she was later Editorial and Public Affairs Director.

In 1978 and 1979 she was an adjunct professor of journalism at New York University.

Speechwriting

In 1984, Noonan, as a speechwriter for President Ronald Reagan, authored his "Boys of Pointe du Hoc" speech on the 40th anniversary of D-Day. She also wrote Reagan's address to the nation after the Challenger explosion, drawing upon the poet John Magee's words about aviators who "slipped the surly bonds of earth ... and touched the face of God." The latter is ranked as the eighth best American political speech of the 20th century, according to a list compiled by professors at the University of Wisconsin–Madison and Texas A&M University. The "Pointe du Hoc" speech ranks as the 58th best speech of the century, according to the website American Rhetoric.

She also worked on a tribute Reagan gave to honor President John F. Kennedy at a fundraising event held at the McLean, Virginia, home of Senator Edward M. Kennedy in the spring of 1984.

Later, while working for then Vice President George H. W. Bush's 1988 presidential campaign, Noonan coined the phrase "a kinder, gentler nation" and also popularized "a thousand points of light", two memorable catchphrases used by Bush. Noonan also wrote Bush's acceptance speech at the Republican National Convention in New Orleans, in which he pledged: "Read my lips: no new taxes". Bush's subsequent reversal of this pledge is often cited as a major reason for his defeat in his 1992 re-election campaign.

In 1995, Noonan received the Golden Plate Award of the American Academy of Achievement presented by Awards Council member and Pulitzer Prize-winning author Edmund Morris.

Later career

Noonan worked as a consultant on the American television drama The West Wing.

In mid-August 2004, Noonan took a brief unpaid leave from The Wall Street Journal to campaign for George W. Bush's reelection.

During the 2008 presidential campaign, Noonan wrote about Sarah Palin's vice presidential candidacy in The Wall Street Journal. In one opinion piece, Noonan expressed her view that Palin did not demonstrate "the tools, the equipment, the knowledge or the philosophical grounding one hopes for, and expects, in a holder of high office," concluding that Palin's candidacy marked a "vulgarization in American Politics" that is "no good... for conservatism... [or] the country." Such commentary resulted in a backlash from many conservatives. In July 2022, in a column about the rise of remote work and empty office buildings, she wrote, "I don’t want America to look like an Edward Hopper painting. He was the great artist of American loneliness—empty streets, tables for one, everyone at the bar drinking alone. We weren’t meant to be a Hopper painting. We were meant to be and work together."

Noonan is an author, a columnist for The Wall Street Journal, and a commentator on several news shows, including CNN, where she distanced herself from more conservative Republicans and Donald Trump's presidency. She was one of the founding members of wowOwow.com, along with Liz Smith, Lesley Stahl, Mary Wells Lawrence, and Joni Evans.

In 2017, Noonan won the Pulitzer Prize for Commentary, for "rising to the moment with beautifully rendered columns that connected readers to the shared virtues of Americans during one of the nation's most divisive political campaigns."

Personal life
In 1985, Noonan married Richard W. Rahn, who was then chief economist at the US Chamber of Commerce. Their son Will was born in 1987.

Noonan and her husband were divorced after five years of marriage. In 1989 she returned with her son to her native New York. In 2004, according to an interview with Crisis Magazine, she lived in a brownstone in Brooklyn Heights with her son, who attended the nearby Saint Ann's School.

Noonan lives in New York City. She is a practicing Roman Catholic and attends St. Thomas More Church on Manhattan's Upper East Side.

Criticism
While Noonan's speechwriting has been praised, her books and Wall Street Journal columns have been the source of criticism and mockery. Critics have singled out her reliance on personal anecdotes to make broad assertions about current events and changes in American politics and society.

In her book What I Saw at the Revolution, she recounts seeing two homeless people outside the White House and then comments: "In Washington in the eighties, as in every American city, the street people no longer tried to arouse an empathy or create a connection that might prompt a hand into a pocket. They often sought to menace ... In Washington in the eighties, the insane were coolly used to advance ideological aims—cruelty in the name of higher compassion, engineered by men and women who were lauded in the press for their decency and concern."

During Hurricane Katrina, she called for looters in New Orleans to be shot. Henry Giroux called it a "barely coded rationale to shoot low-income Black people."

On the day prior to the 2012 United States presidential election, Noonan wrote an article on her Wall Street Journal blog predicting a Mitt Romney victory after seeing Romney yard signs during a trip to Florida, among other indicators. Noonan's prediction was the subject of ridicule.

Nate Silver wrote asking Noonan to present evidence concerning her charge that the IRS was auditing taxpayers for political reasons.

In a March 2013 column, she used her experience staying at a short-staffed airport hotel to demonstrate the Obama administration's lack of focus on job creation and infrastructure spending, even though infrastructure was a significant component of Obama's American Recovery and Reinvestment Act, which Noonan had previously criticized in November 2010. 
In August 2019, Noonan was mocked for writing a column on Donald Trump's support among Hispanic Americans which centered on a conversation she had with a Dominican friend who worked at the deli counter at her grocery store. In June 2019, Noonan wrote a column about the loyalty of Trump's supporters that was based on conversations she had with her sister and her uncle.

Recurring themes in Noonan's books and columns include the decline of civility, social graces, religiosity, patriotism, bipartisanship and statesmanship in contemporary American politics and society, as well as enduring praise for past conservative political figures such as Ronald Reagan and George H. W. Bush. As a result, her writing is criticized for being overly nostalgic.

In June 2019, after Noonan called on congressional Democrats to censure President Trump in the wake of the Mueller report, he attacked her on Twitter, calling her "simplistic" and claiming that she "is stuck in the past glory of Reagan." In June 2022, Trump issued a statement calling Noonan a "weak and frail RINO ... who did much less for Ronald Reagan than she claims, and who actually said bad things about him and his ability to speak" after she wrote in the Wall Street Journal that the Republican Party was "rejecting" Trump in the aftermath of the 2021 United States Capitol attack.

Books

1990: What I Saw at the Revolution: A Political Life in the Reagan Era
1994: Life, Liberty and the Pursuit of Happiness
1998: Simply Speaking: How to Communicate Your Ideas With Style, Substance, and Clarity
1999: On Speaking Well (a paperback edition of "Simply Speaking")
1999: Character Above All (one chapter in an anthology)
2000: The Case Against Hillary Clinton
2001: When Character Was King: A Story of Ronald Reagan
2003: A Heart, A Cross And A Flag
2005: John Paul The Great: Remembering a Spiritual Father
2008: Patriotic Grace: What It Is and Why We Need It Now
2015: The Time of Our Lives: Collected Writings

References

External links

Peggy Noonan official website
Peggy Noonan Biography and Interview on American Academy of Achievement
Peggy Noonan on Twitter
Column archive at The Wall Street Journal

In Depth interview with Noonan, March 3, 2002

1950 births
Living people
20th-century American writers
21st-century American writers
20th-century American women writers
21st-century American women writers
Adelphi University alumni
American columnists
American people of Irish descent
American political commentators
Speechwriters for presidents of the United States
Fairleigh Dickinson University alumni
New York (state) Republicans
Writers from Brooklyn
People from Rutherford, New Jersey
Reagan administration personnel
Rutherford High School (New Jersey) alumni
United States presidential advisors
The Wall Street Journal people
Pulitzer Prize for Commentary winners
People from Brooklyn Heights